The 2018 season was Molde's 11th consecutive year in the top flight, Eliteserien, and their 42nd season in the top flight of Norwegian football. They competed in Eliteserien, the Cup and the 2018–19 UEFA Europa League, which they entered at the First qualifying round stage.

In the Norwegian Cup, Molde advanced from the first round on 18 April 2018 after Træff was defeated with the score 1–6. Daniel Chima Chukwu scored a hat-trick in the game. Molde were drawn against Brattvåg in the second round. Molde lost the game 0–1 in extra time after 90 goalless minutes.

Season events
Ahead of the 2018 season, first team coach Mark Dempsey left Molde on 1 December 2017 to become the new head coach of IK Start.

Squad

Transfers

In

 Knudtzon's moves was announced on the above date, but was finalised on 1 January 2019.

Out

Loans in

Loans out

Released

Friendlies

Competitions

Eliteserien

Results summary

Results by round

Results

Table

Norwegian Cup

Europa League

Qualifying phase

Squad statistics

Appearances and goals

|-
|colspan="14"|Players away from Molde on loan:

|-
|colspan="14"|Players who appeared for Molde no longer at the club:

|}

Goalscorers

Clean sheets

Disciplinary record

See also
Molde FK seasons

References

2018
Molde
Molde